Mr. Fezziwig is a character from the 1843 novella A Christmas Carol created by Charles Dickens to provide contrast with Ebenezer Scrooge's attitudes towards business ethics. Scrooge was apprenticed under Fezziwig. Despite this, the older Scrooge seems to be the very antithesis of Mr. Fezziwig in appearance, actions, and characterization. Mr. Fezziwig is portrayed as a jovial, anachronistic man with a large Welsh Wig.

In Stave 2 of A Christmas Carol, the Ghost of Christmas Past takes Scrooge to revisit his youthful days in Fezziwig's world located at the cusp of the Industrial Revolution.  Dickens used Fezziwig to represent a set of communal values and a way of life which was quickly being swept away in the economic turmoil of the early nineteenth century.

Character
Scrooge, who is a very mean person and does not care about anything but himself and money, diverged greatly from the character of the people under whom he apprenticed and once admired. Fezziwig, as an early adopter of capitalism, moderates profit maximization with kindness, generosity, and affection for his employees. In the early 19th century, such small owner-controlled traders were being swept up.

Film characterizations

In the screenplay for the 1951 film Scrooge by Noel Langley, Fezziwig is advised to bend with the times and sell out, but Fezziwig resists this call to progress:

Jorkin: "Mr. Fezziwig, we’re good friends besides good men of business. We're men of vision and progress. Why don't you sell out while the going’s good? You'll never get a better offer. It’s the age of the machine, and the factory, and the vested interests. We small traders are ancient history, Mr. Fezziwig."

Fezziwig: "It's not just for money alone that one spends a lifetime building up a business…. It's to preserve a way of life that one knew and loved. No, I can't see my way to selling out to the new vested interests, Mr. Jorkin. I'll have to be loyal to the old ways and die out with them if needs must."

In the end, Jorkin hires away Scrooge and buys out Fezziwig's business, moving it from private to shareholder ownership. As agent of shareholder interests, Jorkin and his managers Scrooge and Jacob Marley are constrained from diverging from the goals of profitability, making it more difficult to be a Fezziwig even if they were inclined to. Fezziwig's successor Jorkin demonstrates the weakness of self-interest when he announces to the board of directors that the company is insolvent after years of embezzling. Scrooge and Marley demonstrate their cunning self-interest by using the crisis to attain controlling interest in the company. In Langley's and director Brian Desmond Hurst's Scrooge, these new managers replacing the Fezziwigs are predatory towards shareholders and employees alike, the product of a process and a mindset that Dickens felt was at odds with humanity itself.

Many film adaptions, such as The Muppet Christmas Carol (1992), show Fezziwig's Christmas party as the setting for where Scrooge first met Belle, the beautiful young woman whom he fell in love with and became engaged to. However, Belle eventually breaks off their engagement after Scrooge's obsession with money eclipses his love for her. Fezziwig is mentioned as having three daughters; although their names are not revealed, it is possible that Belle is one of his daughters.

In A Christmas Carol (2004) starring Kelsey Grammer, Fezziwig—following a downturn in his business—approaches Scrooge and Marley for a business loan. Scrooge, starting to turn into his greedy self, refuses the request, stating that he (Scrooge) and Marley would be throwing good money after bad.

Popular culture 
 Fezziwig appears in the 1983 animated featurette, Mickey's Christmas Carol, where he is portrayed in a non-speaking role by Mr. Toad.
 In the 1992 film The Muppet Christmas Carol, he is played by Fozzie Bear and called "Fozziwig".
 The Boston Brewing Company produces Old Fezziwig Ale, a winter seasonal beer named after the character.

References

A Christmas Carol characters
Literary characters introduced in 1843
Fictional people from London
Fictional businesspeople
Fictional people from the 19th-century
Male characters in film
Male characters in literature